B105 or B-105 may refer to:

 B105 FM (call sign: 4BBB), a Mainstream CHR radio station broadcasting out of Brisbane, Queensland, Australia
 B105, one of the B roads in Zone 1 of the Great Britain numbering scheme
 WUBE, a country music radio station broadcasting out of Cincinnati, Ohio, United States of America
 A model of Berkeley Cars made between 1959 and 1960